Diva X Machina is a various artists compilation album released on February 18, 1997, by COP International. The collection was released intending to showcase the burgeoning feminine presence in gothic/industrial music and was the first international compilation to do so featuring all female vocalists.

Reception

AllMusic gave Diva X Machina two and half out of five possible stars. Sonic Boom lauded the album for "shatter[ing] all previous misconceptions" and presenting "all sides of the more diverse gender."

Track listing

Personnel
Adapted from the Diva X Machina liner notes.

 Erik Butler – photography
 Kim Hansen (as Kim X) – compiling
 Stefan "Lupo" Noltemeyer – mastering
 Christian Petke (as Count Zero) – compiling
 Amanda Williams – cover art

Release history

References

External links 
 Diva X Machina at Discogs (list of releases)

1997 compilation albums
COP International compilation albums